Stephen Declan Barrett (26 December 1913 – 8 September 1976) was an Irish Fine Gael politician, barrister and judge.

Early life
He was born 26 December 1913 in Cork, second of three children of George Barrett, leader-writer for the Cork Examiner and later editor of the Evening Echo, and Alice Mary Barrett (née O'Sullivan). His grandfather was Joseph Barrett, Lord Mayor of Cork from 1905 to 1906.

He was educated at the Christian Brothers School, Cork, University College Cork, and the King's Inns. He was called to the bar in 1946.

Career
Between September 1931 and 1947 he served on the staff of the Cork Examiner as reporter, sub-editor, and, finally, chief sub-editor and assistant leader-writer. He was also correspondent for the Daily Mail and the Daily Express (1940–1947). In 1947 he left journalism to practise as a barrister on the Munster circuit, and entered politics as a local Fine Gael councillor on Cork Corporation (1950–1973), serving as Lord Mayor in 1961.

After two unsuccessful candidatures in 1948 and 1951, he was elected to Dáil Éireann as a Fine Gael Teachta Dála (TD) for the Cork Borough constituency at the 1954 by-election caused by the death of Thomas F. O'Higgins of Fine Gael. He was re-elected at each subsequent general election until he retired from politics at the 1969 general election.

Between 1969 and 1972 he served on the RTÉ authority. Appointed a temporary circuit court judge (November 1973), he was appointed in a permanent capacity for Sligo (February 1974) and was later appointed to Galway. A member of An Taisce and a founder of the Newsboys Club, Cork.

His publications included Peering at things (a weekly humorous series in the Cork Examiner (c. 1964–1967), many short stories, articles, The almost people (1973), and a one-act play, Credits due.

Personal life
He married Elizabeth Magnier in 1939, and they had two daughters; Stephanie married Edward M. Walsh, founding president of the University of Limerick. The family lived at Lucerne, Douglas Road, Cork. He died on 8 September 1976 in the North Infirmary, Cork.

References

 

1913 births
1976 deaths
Fine Gael TDs
Members of the 14th Dáil
Members of the 15th Dáil
Members of the 16th Dáil
Members of the 17th Dáil
Members of the 18th Dáil
Politicians from County Cork
Circuit Court (Ireland) judges
Irish barristers
Alumni of University College Cork
Alumni of King's Inns